Spanish Fort or Old Spanish Fort may refer to:

United States
 Spanish Fort, Alabama, a city
 Spanish Fort (Colorado), a Spanish military post built near Sangre de Cristo Pass in 1819
 Spanish Fort (New Orleans), Louisiana, listed on the U.S. National Register of Historical Places (NRHP)
 Spanish Fort Site (Holly Bluff, Mississippi), NRHP-listed
 Old Spanish Fort (Pascagoula, Mississippi), NRHP-listed
 Old Spanish Fort Archeological Site, NRHP-listed in Missouri
 Spanish Fort, Texas, a community and NRHP-listed fort site

Micronesia
 Spanish Fort (Yap), NRHP-listed